Yelarbon is a rural town and locality in the Goondiwindi Region, Queensland, Australia. It is on the border of Queensland and New South Wales.

Geography
Yelarbon is in south-central Queensland on the Dumaresq River, near the New South Wales border. It sits on the Cunningham Highway midway between Goondiwindi and Inglewood.

History
Bigambul (also known as Bigambal, Bigumbil, Pikambul, Pikumbul) is an Australian Aboriginal language spoken by the Bigambul people. The Bigambul language region includes the landscape within the local government boundaries of the Goondiwindi Regional Council, including the towns of Goondiwindi, Yelarbon and Texas extending north towards Moonie and Millmerran.

Yelarbon is an Aboriginal Australian word meaning "Native name for the large lagoon adjacent to the Station."

It was the first place in Queensland to grow tobacco commercially.

Economy
Nowadays, cattle and sheep are raised, and cereal crops are grown. A major employer in Yelarbon is the A. E. Girle and Sons sawmill.

Transport 
The town is located on a branch of the narrow gauge South Western railway line; it is also proposed to be located on a section of the standard gauge Inland Railway from Moree via North Star.

Education 
Yelarbon State School is a government primary (Prep-6) school for boys and girls at 17 Eena Street. In 2018, the school had an enrolment of 41 students with 6 teachers (3 full-time equivalent) and 6 non-teaching staff (4 full-time equivalent).

There is no secondary school in Yelarbon. The nearest secondary schools are Goondiwindi State High School in Goondiwindi (to Year 12) and Inglewood State High School in Inglewood (to Year 10 only).

Recreation 
There is fishing on the Dumaresq River as well, nearly all recreational. The Murray Cod is one of the more sought-after prizes to catch.

There is some feral pig hunting as well in the region.

References

External links 
 
 
 Regional Info on Yelarbon

Towns in Queensland
Towns in the Darling Downs
Goondiwindi Region
Localities in Queensland